WSC was the call sign of Radio Corporation of America's (RCA) marine coast radio station located at first at Siasconset, Nantucket Island, Massachusetts, United States, and later in Tuckerton, New Jersey, and last in West Creek, New Jersey.

Station history
At first the station was owned and operated by the Marconi Company, later by American Marconi Company, and still later by Radio Corporation of America.

Defunct radio stations in the United States
Shortwave radio stations in the United States
Radio stations established in 1950

1950 establishments in Massachusetts